Agnippe echinuloides is a moth of the family Gelechiidae. It is found in Russia (southern Ural, Tuva, Chita Region) and Mongolia.

The wingspan is 10–11 mm. The forewings have a black basal patch and two black subtriangular spots fused near the costal margin. The posterior half of the forewings is white. The hindwings are light grey. Adults are on wing in June.

Etymology
The name of the species refers to the close relation with Agnippe echinulata.

References

Moths described in 2010
Agnippe
Moths of Asia